Cane Hill was a psychiatric hospital in Coulsdon in the London Borough of Croydon.

Cane Hill may also refer to:
Cane Hill Township, Washington County, Arkansas
Canehill, Arkansas
Cane Hill College, an institution of higher learning in Arkansas
Cane Hill, Missouri, an unincorporated community

Music
 Cane Hill (band), an American nu-metal band
Cane Hill (EP), 2015 debut EP by Cane Hill

See also
Cane Hill Cemetery, a cemetery in Canehill, Arkansas
Battle of Cane Hill, an 1862 American Civil War battle in Arkansas
Cane Hill Formation, a geologic formation in Arkansas 
 Caen Hill Locks, a flight on the Kennet and Avon Canal